Yodrak Namuangrak (born September 19, 1989), simply known as Yod, is a Thai professional footballer who plays as a left back for Thai League 2 club Rayong.

International career

Yordrak played for Thailand U19, and played in the 2008 AFC U-19 Championship.

International goals

Under-19

Honours

Club
Sriracha
 Thai Division 1 League: 2010
BG Pathum United
 Thailand Champions Cup: 2021

External links
 Profile at Goal
 Y. Namuangrak

1989 births
Living people
Yodrak Namuangrak
Yodrak Namuangrak
Association football fullbacks
Yodrak Namuangrak
Yodrak Namuangrak
Yodrak Namuangrak
Yodrak Namuangrak
Yodrak Namuangrak
Yodrak Namuangrak
Yodrak Namuangrak